Grand Gulf State Park is a state-operated, privately owned and publicly accessible, geologic preserve near Thayer, Missouri, United States, encompassing a forked canyon that is the remnant of an ancient collapsed dolomite cave system. The land that is now the park was acquired by conservationist Leo Drey (1917–2015) before becoming part of the Missouri state parks system. The  state park has been operated by the Missouri Department of Natural Resources under a lease agreement with the L-A-D Foundation since 1984. Grand Gulf was declared a National Natural Landmark in 1971 as an excellent example of karst topography and underground stream piracy. A  portion of the park was designated by the state as the Grand Gulf Natural Area in 1986.

Description
An uncollapsed part of the original cavern roof spans , creating one of the largest natural bridges in Missouri. A watershed of  feeds into the gulf which itself drains into a cave entrance at its eastern end. Dye traces have shown that water entering the cave in Grand Gulf emerges 1 to 4 days later at Mammoth Spring in Arkansas, 9 miles (14 km) distant.

Facilities
The park has picnicking facilities and two trails for viewing the gulf. The park's heavy foliage makes fall and winter the best viewing seasons.

References

External links

 Grand Gulf State Park Missouri Department of Natural Resources
 Grand Gulf State Park Map Missouri Department of Natural Resources

National Natural Landmarks in Missouri
State parks of Missouri
State parks of the U.S. Interior Highlands
Rock formations of Missouri
Protected areas of Oregon County, Missouri
Geology of Missouri
Protected areas established in 1984
Landforms of Oregon County, Missouri
1984 establishments in Missouri